Mount Cromwell is a mountain located in the Sunwapta River Valley of Jasper National Park, in Alberta, Canada. Cromwell lies two kilometers north of the east summit of Stutfield Peak. The mountain was named in 1972 by J. Monroe Thorington after Oliver Eaton (Tony) Cromwell, an American climber who made many first ascents in the Canadian Rockies.

The first ascent was made in 1938 by E. Cromwell, E. Cromwell jr., F.S. North, J. Monroe Thorington, guided by Edward Feuz jr.

In 2005, Bill Corbett, author of "The 11,000ers of the Canadian Rockies," climbed to the top of Mount Cromwell.  At the summit, his GPS registered 11,006 feet.  So perhaps Mount Cromwell should be included in the list of the Canadian Rocky Mountains that are over 11,000 feet in elevation.

Climate

Based on the Köppen climate classification, Cromwell is located in a subarctic climate zone with cold, snowy winters, and mild summers. Winter temperatures can drop below -20 °C with wind chill factors below -30 °C. Precipitation runoff from the mountain drains into the Athabasca River.

Geology
The mountain is composed of sedimentary rock laid down during the Precambrian to Jurassic periods and pushed east and over the top of younger rock during the Laramide orogeny.

See also
List of mountains of Canada

References

External links
 Parks Canada web site: Jasper National Park
 Weather forecast: Mount Cromwell

Cromwell
Cromwell
Cromwell
Cromwell